Worlds Apart is a 7" vinyl EP by the Australian indie group The Go-Betweens, released on 7 November 2005 on LO-MAX Records in the UK only. It contains a collaboration with Sushil K. Dade (alternatively known as Future Pilot A.K.A.), "The City of Lights", which was included on his 2006 album, Secrets of the Clockhouse. "The City of Lights" was recorded in Glasgow in 2005 with Dade producing. "Finding You", "Ashes on the Lawn" and "Crystal Shacks" were recorded during the Oceans Apart sessions at the Good Luck Studios in London between November 2004 and January 2005. "Sleeping Giant", however, was recorded in Brisbane in 2004.

"Sleeping Giant", according to Robert Forster, was one of the songs which failed to make it on to the album, The Friends of Rachel Worth, in 2000. Because he wrote the song in 1998 about his son, Louis, Forster later jokingly said, "I've now retitled it 'An Old Song That I Wrote about My Son.'" "He's four now. It was just after he was born... I like the song... I'm scared of turning into Graham Nash, you know, the sort of person who writes about their children. It's a scary area. But I think its done quite well." Similarly, "Ashes on the Lawn" was intended to be included on the band's eighth studio album, Bright Yellow Bright Orange, but also failed to make the final list. It was a Go-Betweens song because you can hear it's Robert and Grant singing. But music-wise it was a bit of a shock... the way it was structured, or recorded, it was really a stadium-rock song."

Track listing

7" vinyl release

Digital download

Credits

Musicians 
Go-Betweens
 Robert Forster – vocals, guitar, piano, melodica
 Grant McLennan – vocals, guitar
 Adele Pickvance – bass guitar, keyboards, backing vocals ("Finding You", "Sleeping Giant") 
 Glenn Thompson – drums, keyboards, guitar, backing vocals ("Finding You", "Sleeping Giant") 
Additional musicians
 Dave Ruffy – keyboards, percussion ("Finding You")

Production 
 Recording, mixing – Colin McGeoh, Ronan Breslin ("City of Light")
 Producer – Dave Ruffy ("Finding You")
 Producer – Mark Wallis ("Finding You")
 Producer – The Go-Betweens ("Sleeping Giant")
 Producer – Sushil K. Dade ("City of Light")

References 

The Go-Betweens albums
2005 EPs